Kommuna is a rural locality (a settlement) in Mozhayskoye Rural Settlement, Kashirsky District, Voronezh Oblast, Russia. The population was 57 as of 2010.

Geography 
Kommuna is located 26 km south of Kashirskoye (the district's administrative centre) by road. Posyolok Ilyicha is the nearest rural locality.

References 

Rural localities in Kashirsky District, Voronezh Oblast